UTC−07:00 is an identifier for a time offset from UTC of −07:00. In North America, it is observed in the Mountain Time Zone during standard time, and in the Pacific Time Zone during the other eight months (see Daylight saving time). Some locations use it year-round.

As standard time (Northern Hemisphere winter)
Principal cities: Denver, Salt Lake City, Phoenix (year-round), Edmonton, Ciudad Juárez

North America
 Canada (Mountain Time Zone)
 Alberta
 British Columbia
 The southeastern communities of Cranbrook, Golden, Invermere and Kimberley
 Northwest Territories
 Nunavut
 Kitikmeot Region
 Saskatchewan
 Lloydminster
 Mexico
 Baja California Sur, Chihuahua, Nayarit and Sinaloa states
 United States (Mountain Time Zone)
 Arizona – Navajo Nation only (most of Arizona uses MST year-round)
 Colorado
 Idaho
 South of Salmon River
 Kansas
 The western counties of Greeley, Hamilton, Sherman and Wallace
 Montana
 Nebraska
 The western counties of Cherry (western part), Hooker, Arthur, Keith, Perkins, Chase and Dundy, and all counties to the west of these
 Nevada
 West Wendover
 New Mexico
 North Dakota
 The Southwestern counties of Adams, Billings, Bowman, Dunn (southern part), Golden Valley, Grant, Hettinger, McKenzie (southern part), Sioux (west of ND route 31), Slope and Stark
 Oklahoma
 Kenton
 Oregon
 Malheur County (except a small strip in the south)
 South Dakota
 The western counties of Corson, Dewey, Stanley (western part), Jackson and Bennett, and all counties to the west of these
 Texas
 The western counties of Culberson (northwestern part), El Paso and Hudspeth
 Utah
 Wyoming

As daylight saving time (Northern Hemisphere summer)
Principal cities: Los Angeles, Vancouver, Tijuana

North America
 Canada (Pacific Time Zone)
British Columbia
Except Northern Rockies Regional Municipality, Peace River Regional District, and the southeastern communities of Cranbrook, Golden and Invermere
 Mexico
Baja California
 United States (Pacific Time Zone)
California
Idaho
 North of Salmon River
Nevada (except West Wendover)
Oregon
All of the state except Malheur County (but including a small strip in the south of Malheur)
Washington

As standard time (year-round) 
Principal cities: Phoenix, Hermosillo

North America
 Canada (Mountain Time Zone)
British Columbia
 Northern Rockies Regional Municipality
 Peace River Regional District
Yukon
 Mexico
Sonora
 United States (Mountain Time Zone)
Arizona, except the Arizona Navajo Nation, which observes DST

References

External links

UTC offsets